Richard Holmes (born September 24, 1952) is a former all-star running back in the Canadian Football League.

A Fighting Scot from Edinboro State College, Holmes joined the Toronto Argonauts in 1977, but played only 3 games and rushed for 151 yards with them. He finished the year with the Ottawa Rough Riders, rushing for another 865 yards (giving him 1016 for the season) and scoring 11 touchdowns. He was an eastern all-star. He played 2 more season with Ottawa and finished 1979 with the Winnipeg Blue Bombers.

Holmes played one final season in the United States Football League, playing 18 games with the Tampa Bay Bandits.

References

1952 births
Living people
Canadian football running backs
Edinboro Fighting Scots football players
Ottawa Rough Riders players
People from Hope Mills, North Carolina
Players of American football from North Carolina
Tampa Bay Bandits players
Toronto Argonauts players
Winnipeg Blue Bombers players